The Ambassador (Ambasador) is a 1984 Croatian film directed by Fadil Hadžić, starring Miodrag Radovanović and Fabijan Šovagović.

Sources

External links
 

1984 films
1980s Croatian-language films
Films directed by Fadil Hadžić
Croatian drama films
Films set in Zagreb
1984 drama films
Yugoslav drama films
Films set in Yugoslavia